Longueville-sur-Scie (literally Longueville on Scie) is a commune in the Seine-Maritime department in the Normandy region in northern France.

Geography
The commune is served by the TER railway between Dieppe and Rouen.

Coat of arms

Population

Places of interest
 The church of St.Pierre, dating from the eleventh century.
 Ruins of an 11th-century castle, built by Walter Giffard, Lord of Longueville.

Miscellany
The village was formerly known as Longueville-le-Giffard, one of its sons was Osbern Giffard, who gave his name to Stoke Gifford, South Gloucestershire, England.

Longueville-sur-Scie is twinned with Newton Longville in Buckinghamshire, England.

See also
Communes of the Seine-Maritime department

References

Communes of Seine-Maritime